Various plants are used around the world for smoking due to various chemical compounds they contain and the effects of these chemicals on the human body. This list contains plants that are smoked, rather than those that are used in the process of smoking or in the preparation of the substance.

Althaea officinalis ~ "Marshmallow"
Amaranthus dubius
Arctostaphylos uva-ursi ~ "Bearberry" 
Argemone mexicana
Arnica
Artemisia vulgaris ~ "Mugwort"
Asteraceae species ~ "Chamomile"
Cabbage ~ Brassica Oleracea
Calea zacatechichi
Calendula
Canavalia maritima ~ "Baybean"
Cannabis THC and CBD
Cecropia mexicana ~ "Guamura"
Cestrum nocturnum ~ "Hasana" ???
Cynoglossum virginianum L. ~ "Wild comfrey"
Cytisus scoparius
Damiana
Entada rheedii
Eschscholzia californica ~ “California Poppy”
Fittonia albivenis
Hippobroma longiflora
Humulus japonica ~ “Japanese Hops”
Humulus lupulus  ~ "Hops"
Lavandula species ~ "Lavender"
Lactuca virosa ~ "Lettuce Opium"
Laggera alata ~ "?”
Lamiaceae species ~ "Mint"
Leonotis leonurus ~ "Lion's tail" or "Wild dagga"
Leonurus cardiaca ~ "Motherwort" 
Leonurus sibiricus ~ "Honeyweed"
Lobelia cardinalis
Lobelia inflata ~ "Indian-tobacco"
Lobelia inflata
Lobelia siphilitica
Nepeta cataria ~ "Catnip"
Nicotiana species ~ "Tobacco"
Nymphaea alba ~ "White Lily"
Nymphaea caerulea ~ "Blue Lily"
Opium poppy
Origanum majorana ~ "Marjoram"
Origanum vulgare ~ "Oregano"
Passiflora incarnata ~ "Passionflower"
Pedicularis densiflora ~ "Indian Warrior" 
Pedicularis groenlandica ~ "Elephant's Head"
Red raspberry leaf
Rubus occidentalis
Salvia divinorum
Salvia dorrii ~ "Tobacco Sage"
Salvia species ~ “Sage”, etc.
Scutellaria galericulata
Scutellaria lateriflora
Scutellaria nana
Scutellaria species ~ "Skullcap"
Sida acuta  ~ "Wireweed"
Sida rhombifolia ~ "Wireweed"
Silene capensis
Syzygium aromaticum - "Clove"
Tagetes lucida ~ "Mexican Tarragon"
Tarchonanthus camphoratus ~ "???"
Turnera diffusa ~ "Damiana"
Tussilago farfara ~ "Coltsfoot"
Verbascum species ~ "Mullein"
Zornia latifolia ~ "Maconha Brava"

See also 

 Changa
Entheogenic drugs and the archaeological record
 List of Acacia species known to contain psychoactive alkaloids
 List of psychoactive plants
 List of psychoactive plants, fungi, and animals
 N,N-Dimethyltryptamine
 Psilocybin mushrooms
 Psychoactive cacti

References

Herbal Smoking Mixtures by Howie Brounstein, http://home.teleport.com/~howieb/smoking/smoke6.html
Native American ethnobotany By Daniel E. Moerman
Medicinal plants and herbs by Steven Foster and James A. Duke, peterson field guides

Plants used For Smoking